Sculpture Review is the official illustrated publication of the National Sculpture Society (NSS).  It is concerned with figurative sculpture. It features articles about the history of figurative sculpture and sculptors as well as current artists and trends.  Sculpture Review is now published by SAGE Publishing.

It began being published as National Sculpture Review in 1951 and is published on a quarterly basis. The name was changed from National Sculpture Review to Sculpture Review in the 1980s.

Sources

Visual arts magazines published in the United States
Quarterly magazines published in the United States
Magazines established in 1951
Contemporary art magazines
American contemporary art
Magazines published in New York City
1951 establishments in the United States